Chengdu–Mianyang–Leshan intercity railway is a higher-speed intercity railway in Sichuan Province that connects Mianyang, Chengdu, Deyang, Meishan, Emei and Leshan. Construction began in 2008 and was completed on June 29, 2014. Revenue service began on December 20, 2014.

Route & service
Under the plan, the Chengdu–Mianyang–Leshan intercity railway starts at the renovated Chengdu railway station, going north through Deyang to Mianyang, stopping at Jiangyou. Southbound, the railway line passes through Chengdu Shuangliu International Airport to Meishan and Emei, ending in Leshan. Altogether ten cities, namely Jiangyou, Mianyang, Deyang, Guanghan, Chengdu, Pengshan, Meishan, Jiajiang, Emei and Leshan, are linked together from north to south by the railway.

There are 21 stations along the route. Like public buses, the intercity trains run from 6am till 11pm. During peak hours, a train leaves the station every few minutes.

History
The Chengdu–Mianyang–Leshan intercity railway was a major reconstruction project in Sichuan following the earthquake of May 2008. The National Development and Reform Commission (NDRC) approved the construction of the passenger railway line running from Jiangyou to Chengdu and Emei at a cost of RMB 42 billion. Upon completion of this intercity line, it would take only 51 and 54 minutes respectively to travel by train from Chengdu to Jiangyou and E'mei situated at both ends of the line. Trains can easily pass through 10 cities within two hours.

Construction began on December 20, 2008, and was expected to take four years. The line opened on December 20, 2014.

References

High-speed railway lines in China
Railway lines opened in 2014